The International Equestrian Sports Complex is the largest horse racing hippodrome in Turkmenistan. The total area of the complex is 90 hectares. The complex was opened on 29 October 2011, at a cost of US$106,800,000. The hippodrome was constructed by the Turkish company Etkin.

The circuit allows both jumps and races to take place. It is located in Ashgabat on Kopetdag Avenue, situated near the National Museum of Wildlife of Turkmenistan. It has stables for 600 horses. Along with the race track and stables, there are also 57 two-storied cottages and two family houses for 114 owners, kindergarten for 160 children, 2 markets, a playground and sports fields, as well as a social-cultural center.

With the completion of the development of the equestrian village in April 2016, the International Equestrian Sports Complex has been renamed the International Akhalteke Equestrian Complex.

References

 International Equestrian Sports Complex

Sport in Turkmenistan
Sports venues completed in 2011